PD-Atrics is the fourth album released by jazz-based hip hop and pop rock band Pocket Dwellers. It was released in 2005.

Track listing
"Stop"  – 3:48
"Circus" – 3:18
"Trust Us" – 2:56
"Electrify" – 3:26
"Critical Acclaim" – 4:08
"Want to Be" – 3:03
"Repetition" – 3:56
"Got Faith?" – 2:01
"Photogenic" – 3:32
"Marvelous" – 3:13
"Play this Music!" – 2:55
"Mary Jane" – 4:05
"Peep The Lesson" – 4:44
"Poor Little White Girl" – 2:10

Pocket Dwellers albums
2005 albums